Banco Popular or Banco Popolare may refer to:

 Popular, Inc., the bank based in Puerto Rico doing business as Banco Popular
 Banco Popular Español, the bank based in Spain
 Banco Popular Dominicano, the bank based in the Dominican Republic
 Banco Popolare, the Italian bank based in Verona
 Banco Popolare Siciliano, a subsidiary
 Banco Popolare Sassari, an Italian professional basketball club sponsored by the bank
 Banco Popular, the bank based in Tegucigalpa, Honduras